Ingstrup is a village in North Jutland, Denmark. It is located in Jammerbugt Municipality.

History
A train station was located in Ingstrup between 1913 and 1963. The station was built by Sylvius Knutzen and was a stop on the Hjørring-Løkken-Aabybro railroad.

Notable residents 
 Søren Reese (born 1993), football player

References

Cities and towns in the North Jutland Region
Jammerbugt Municipality
Villages in Denmark